The 2021 Salford City Council election to elect members of Salford City Council in England took place in May 2021, on the same day as other local elections.

Boundary changes

The Local Government Boundary Commission for England has reported on the Salford Council area and has redrawn the local authority boundaries to create a new ward boundary map

Results summary

Ward results

Barton and Winton

Blackfriars and Trinity

Boothstown and Ellenbrook

Broughton

Cadishead and Lower Irlam

Claremont

Eccles

Higher Irlam and Peel Green

Kersal and Broughton Park

Little Hulton

Ordsall

Pendlebury and Clifton

Pendleton and Charlestown

Quays

Swinton and Wardley

Swinton Park

Walkden North

Walkden South

Weaste and Seedley

Worsley and Westwood Park

By-elections

Blackfriars & Trinity

References

Salford
2021
2020s in Greater Manchester
May 2021 events in the United Kingdom